Apoctena clarkei, also known as the umbrella fern bell moth, is a species of moth of the  family Tortricidae. It is found in New Zealand, where it is only found on the North Island.

Description 
The larvae of this species are coloured yellow to greenish and have a pale brown head. When mature they are approximately 25mm long.

Behaviour 
The larva of this species create silk webbing around the fronds of its host and hide within that structure. They will emerge from it to feed. The adult moth is on the wing in the New Zealand summer.

Hosts 
The larvae feed on Sticherus species including Sticherus cunninghamii.

References

Moths described in 1930
Epitymbiini
Moths of New Zealand
Endemic fauna of New Zealand
Endemic moths of New Zealand